Sir Hugh Henderson Taylor,  (born 22 March 1950) is a British former Permanent Secretary at the Department of Health and current Chair of Guy's and St Thomas' NHS Foundation Trust.

Early life and education
Taylor was born on 22 March 1950. He was educated at Brentwood School and Emmanuel College, Cambridge.

Career
Taylor began his Civil Service career at the Home Office in 1972 before joining the Department of Health in 1998, where he was Permanent Secretary between 2006 and 2010. He retired from that position on 31 July 2010, to become Chair of Guy's and St Thomas' NHS Foundation Trust in February 2011. He was also enlisted as the interim chair of Christie Hospital NHS Foundation Trust in March 2014 after Lord Keith Bradley resigned, and the law had to be changed to permit him to be a non-executive director of two NHS Trusts at the same time. He is also a trustee of the Nuffield Trust.  In 2015 Sir Hugh took up post as independent Chair of the Accelerated Access Review for bringing innovative medical technologies to NHS patients.  Taylor was Permanent Secretary of the Department of Health, at the time of the failings which led to thousands of deaths at Mid Staffs NHS Trust.  Taylor gave evidence to the Francis Inquiry which reviewed these deaths  https://www.gov.uk/government/publications/report-of-the-mid-staffordshire-nhs-foundation-trust-public-inquiry.  The Francis Report cited one of the root causes of the failings at Mid Staffs as political and hence civil service pressure for Trusts to achieve the financial performance required to achieve Foundation Trust status, which led some Trusts (probably many more than Mid Staffs) to cut nursing staff and other costs, and generally putting the achievement of arbitrary political financial targets ahead of patient safety and clinical quality.  Nonetheless, Taylor as the senior civil servant responsible for the healthcare system in England at that time, was not singled out for personal criticism, and was allowed to become a chair of NHS organisations.

References

British civil servants
Living people
Administrators in the National Health Service
Permanent Under-Secretaries of State for Health
1950 births
Alumni of Emmanuel College, Cambridge
Knights Commander of the Order of the Bath